Gordon Charles Burgess  (4 October 1918 – 3 September 2000) was a New Zealand cricket player and administrator.

Life and family
Born in Waihi on 4 October 1918, Burgess was the son of Edith Alice Burgess and Walter Neilson Burgess. He was educated at Mount Albert Grammar School in Auckland, and worked for Auckland City Council as a clerk and valuer from 1935 to 1951. In 1942, Burgess married June Frankham, and the couple went on to have three children, including Mark Burgess who played Test cricket for New Zealand.

During World War II, Burgess served as a lieutenant in the New Zealand Army between 1942 and 1944. He completed a Diploma of Urban Valuation at Auckland University College in 1948. From 1951 until his retirement in 1983, Burgess worked in property management for the Auckland Harbour Board.

Cricket

Playing career
Burgess played seven first-class matches as a batsman for Auckland between 1940 and 1954. He scored 219 runs, at an average of 18.25, and with a highest score of 35 runs.

Administration
Burgess was a member of the New Zealand Cricket Council from 1962 to 1971, and was its president from 1979 to 1981. He managed the New Zealand team that toured England, India and Pakistan in 1969. The series in Pakistan was New Zealand's first win in a Test series.

In the 1989 New Year Honours, Burgess was appointed an Officer of the Order of the British Empire, for services to cricket.

Death
Burgess died in Auckland on 3 September 2000, and his body was cremated at Purewa Crematorium.

References

External links

1918 births
2000 deaths
Auckland cricketers
New Zealand cricketers
New Zealand Officers of the Order of the British Empire
New Zealand cricket administrators
People from Waihi
People educated at Mount Albert Grammar School
New Zealand military personnel of World War II
University of Auckland alumni
New Zealand Army officers
Cricketers from Waikato